Clematis reticulata, commonly known as the netleaf leather flower, is a flowering plant. Synonymous species names are Coriflora reticulata, Viorna reticulata, and Viorna subreticulata. It is in the Clematis genus and the Ranunculaceae (buttercup) family. It grows in the southeastern United States including parts of Florida and Alabama. It is a dicot with alternate leaves.

References

reticulata